The 1974–75 Iowa State Cyclones men's basketball team represented Iowa State University during the 1974–75 NCAA Division I men's basketball season. The Cyclones were coached by Ken Trickey, who was in his first season with the Cyclones. They played their home games at Hilton Coliseum in Ames, Iowa.

They finished the season 10–16, 4–10 in Big Eight play to finish in a tie for seventh place.

Roster

Schedule and results 

|-
!colspan=6 style=""|Regular Season

|-

References 

Iowa State Cyclones men's basketball seasons
Iowa State
Iowa State Cyc
Iowa State Cyc